Michael Andrew James Burrows (born 1961) is a bishop in the Church of Ireland. He was elected Bishop of the Diocese of Tuam, Limerick and Killaloe on 14 January 2022, having previously served as Bishop of Cashel, Ferns and Ossory.

Life
Bishop Burrows is the son of a Church of Ireland clergyman. He was educated at Wesley College, Dublin and Trinity College, Dublin and ordained as a priest in the Church of Ireland in 1988.

He was appointed Dean of Cork at the Cathedral Church of St Fin Barre in 2002. He was elected Bishop of Cashel and Ossory on 31 March 2006 and consecrated at Christ Church Cathedral, Dublin on 3 July 2006. He replaced the Right Reverend Peter Barrett, who resigned as bishop following the breakdown of his marriage.

He is married and has four children. He is described as liberal and a supporter of same-sex unions.

References

External links
Diocese of Cashel and Ossory

Bishops of Cashel and Ossory
1961 births
Living people
Deans of Cork
People educated at Wesley College, Dublin
Alumni of Trinity College Dublin